Polperro (meaning Pyra's cove) is a large village, civil parish, and fishing harbour within the Polperro Heritage Coastline in south Cornwall, England. Its population is around 1,554.

It is a noted tourist destination, particularly in the summer months, for its idyllic appearance with tightly-packed ancient fishermen's houses which survive almost untouched, its quaint harbour and attractive coastline.

History

Toponymy
The name Polperro derives from the Cornish Porthpyra, meaning harbour named after Pyran. However Ekwall suggests that "Pyra" or "Pira" may not be a personal name and suggests that "Perro" could be a name for the stream. Early forms are Portpira, 1303, and Porpira, 1379. The chapel of St Peter de Porthpyre is mentioned in 1398 and the following forms are recorded from the reign of King Henry VIII: Polpyz explained as "fish-pool" (probably a literal error for Polpyr), Poulpirrhe, Poul Pier and Poulpyrre (in John Leland's account).

Early history
Polperro, since medieval times, fell under the jurisdiction of two ancient and separate manors, those of Raphael in the parish of Lansallos, west of the River Pol which runs through the middle of the village, and Killigarth to the east in the parish of Talland, mentioned in the Domesday Book.

As early as the 13th century Polperro was a recognised fishing settlement and its first known record is in a Royal document of 1303.

Later history

The date of the building of Polperro's older quay is uncertain but Jonathan Couch (writing in the mid-19th century) considered that it is either the one mentioned by John Leland or one built upon the same site. It was probably built under the patronage of the lord of the manor of Raphael who owned the harbour and its rights. Polperro's newer quay, also of unknown antiquity, is sited almost on an east-west alignment a little further out to sea. It was built before 1774 when it suffered much damage in a storm, following which Thomas Long, of Penheale and lord of the manors of Raphael and Lansallos, paid for its repair.

Parts of the harbour were rebuilt after destruction by a violent storm on 19 and 20 January 1817, when thirty large boats, two seiners and many smaller boats were destroyed with many parts of the village including the Green and Peak Rock were consumed by the sea waters and a number of houses were swept away. The damage was estimated at £2,000 but there were no deaths. This storm, with hurricane-force winds, caused damage to property from Plymouth to Land's End; the fishing boats at Polperro ″shared in the common calamity and exposed the unhappy sufferers to distress from which the industry of years can scarcely be expected to relieve them″.

In November 1824 the worst ever storm occurred: three houses were destroyed, the whole of one pier and half the other were swept away and nearly 50 boats in the harbour were dashed to pieces. Of the six boats that survived, only one of which was a Gaffer. Polperro's new pier was designed to afford better protection for the future. The East Indiaman Albemarle was blown ashore with a valuable cargo of diamonds, coffee, pepper, silk and indigo on 9 December 1708 near Polperro (the precise location of the wreck is yet to be discovered).

Jonathan Couch was the village doctor for many years, and wrote the history of the village as well as various works of natural history (particularly on ichthyology). The History of Polperro, 1871, was published after his death by his son, Thomas Quiller Couch, with many abridgements since. Couch contributed two series of articles to the periodical Notes and Queries – The Folklore of a Cornish Village 1855 and 1857, and these were incorporated in the History of Polperro, to which he also contributed a sketch of his father's life. The welfare of the fishermen and the prosperity of the fisheries were in his care together with his medical and scientific work.

Polperro's beauty has long been a magnet for artists. The celebrated Austrian painter Oskar Kokoschka, upon discovering Polperro, spent a year in the village between 1939 and 1940.

Smuggling

Smuggling is understood to have prospered since Polperro developed as a port in the 12th century. It reached its zenith in the late 18th century when Britain's wars with America and France precipitated the high taxation of many imported goods, making it worthwhile for the local fishermen to boost their income by the covert importation of spirits, tobacco and other goods from Guernsey and elsewhere. By the late 18th century, much of the success of the smuggling trade through Polperro was controlled by Zephaniah Job (1749–1822), a local merchant who became known as the 'Smugglers' Banker'.

A more organised Coast Guard service was introduced in the 19th century together with the deterrent of stiff penalties, leading to much less smuggling. Part of the South West Coast Path was originally used by Revenue Officers as they patrolled the coast in search of smugglers. Whilst the South West Coast Path is maintained by the National Trust, the foreshore belongs to the Duchy of Cornwall.

Robert Jeffery
In 1807, on Commander Warwick Lake's , Robert Jeffery, a Polperroite, was found to have stolen his midshipman's beer, and Lake, in a fit of pique, ordered him to be marooned on the island of Sombrero off Anguilla. Jeffery was born in Fowey but moved to Polperro before joining the merchant navy and then being press-ganged into the Royal Navy.

Some months later, Lake's commanding officer Sir Alexander Cochrane learned of what had happened and immediately ordered Lake to retrieve Jeffery. When Recruit arrived at Sombrero, Jeffery could not be found. Eventually the story got out and Lake was discharged from the Royal Navy by court martial for his actions. As it turned out, Jeffery had been rescued by an American ship and was discovered in Massachusetts three years later, working as a blacksmith; he was repatriated to Britain and awarded compensation.

Economy

Tourism

Tourism became Polperro's main industry during the 20th century. The village is accessible by air via Plymouth or Newquay, by train via Looe railway station, by road and by boat. It was estimated that the village received about 25,000 visitors a day during summer in the 1970s. Visitors are no longer permitted to drive cars into the village, having to leave them in the main car park at Crumplehorn to the north of the village and walk through the half-mile length of the village to its harbour. The village's quaint but narrow streets make driving difficult. There are horse and cart rides and milk floats disguised as trams for those who prefer not to walk.

Attractions of Polperro include the South West Coast Path, the -long and established walk from Dorset to Somerset which passes through the village, and offers day walks along the local scenic coastline, in particular to nearby Talland Bay on the coast path heading East. Westwards, the path passes three large beaches en route to Fowey: Lansallos Beach, Lantivit Bay and Lantic Bay. Within the village is the Polperro Heritage Museum of Fishing and Smuggling, situated on the harbourside in an old fish processing warehouse, which houses interesting photographs of the village's history among other popular displays. Guided walks are available in the village, and boat trips can be taken from the harbour to view the coastline which can offer sightings of dolphins and seals.

The village has several restaurants as well as seven pubs. A holiday and caravan park is situated outside the village to the northeast at Carey Park.

Fishing

Fishing was traditionally the principal occupation of Polperro families. For centuries the village has been a pilchard fishing and processing port. Fish are drawn for feeding off the South Cornwall coast in late summer bringing rich pickings for local fishermen. Once ashore, the fish were salted and pressed and the oil was collected as a by-product and used for heating and lighting. Polperro pilchards were exported throughout Europe.

Shoals of these fish diminished in the 20th century and pilchard fishing died out as Polperro's mainstay in the 1960s, however approximately twelve commercial fishing vessels still operate from the harbour catching flatfish, scallops, crabs, monkfish, ray, pollock, bass and cod. Fresh fish and seafood are available for purchase at the quayside from time to time.

Festivals
Other than traditional festival days, The Polperro Festival has been held annually since 1996, being a community festival run by volunteers beginning on the 3rd Saturday in June which helps to promote business for the village. It started as an Arts and crafts Festival, and has developed to include live music of many genres, dance, street entertainment, theatre and children's entertainment and local food. Most of the entertainment centres on Big Green, the village square, and for the last few years under a covered marquee. After 9 pm, for noise considerations, the festivities at Big Green disperse elsewhere.

Lord Mayors
As part of the Polperro festivities, a Lord Mayor is chosen in secret and revealed on the main stage on the first Saturday. Their identity is kept secret until the reveal and they are brought out wearing an outfit that best represents them and what they are recognised for within the village. The Lord Mayor is then paraded through the village accompanied by their "Merry Men" where they go to every pub and inn to taste the ale, to make sure it is suitable for the village for the upcoming year. Once they have visited all the pubs and inns, they are then brought down the beach where they "meet the tide". This marks the opening of the festival and traditionally was meant for the village drunk or local idiot where they would throw them in the harbour in an attempt to sober them up.

Past Lord Mayors of Polperro
Here is a current list of all the previous Lord Mayors of Polperro since its conception in 1996:

1996 - Ashley Courts

1997 - John Holden

1998 - Brenda Thomas

1999 - Joe Card

2000 - Chris Pannewitz

2001 - Terry Bicknell

2002 - Gilly Davis

2003 - Martin "Beaver" Thomas

2004 - Alun "Pendragon" Thomas

2005 - Ted Pilcher

2006 - Glenda Taper

2007 - Erica Gregory

2008 - John "Grandad" Marshall

2009 - Alan "Coach" Morris

2010 - Robert Chisman

2011 - Tony White

2012 - Sam Baker

2013 - Nathan "Small" Toms

2014 - Franco Miceli

2015 - Abbi Rendell

2016 - Brian & Rita Morgan

2017 - Gina Farrell

2018 - James Overton

2019 - Mike Jelly

2022 - Phil Thomas

Note: There was no festival held between 2020 & 2021 due to the COVID-19 pandemic. Instead Mike Jelly held onto the Lord Mayor title until handing over to Phil Thomas in 2022.

Firsts in Lord Mayors
Ashley Courts was the first Lord Mayor of Polperro and first male Lord Mayor. Brenda Thomas was the first female Lord Mayor. Martin "Beaver" Thomas was the second member of the same family to be Lord Mayor (Thomas '98). Brian & Rita Morgan were the first duo to be Lord Mayor together. Mike Jelly was the first Lord Mayor to hold onto the title for more than a year. Phil Thomas was the third member of the same family to be Lord Mayor (Thomas '98 & '03).

Lord Mayors money, portrait and Lord Mayors Ball
In addition to having a robe and hat made for the Lord Mayor, ceremonial money is made with their face on. This money is strictly ceremonial and has no real value within the village anymore. They are also presented with a portrait painted by a local artist which is displayed the following year of their reign as Lord Mayor, each Lord Mayor reigns only for one year (with the exception of Mike Jelly due to the COVID-19 pandemic) and it is their job to open new businesses throughout the year and also be present at any other activities or festivities happening within the village during their reign. As a result, a Lord Mayors Ball is held in their honour, usually around April time, which is a night held for festivities and merriment. The current Lord Mayor can choose what band is to be played and in recent years will choose a theme for patrons to dress up. All money raised on this night is then donated back in the Polperro Festival Fund ready for the next years festival and the next Lord Mayor.

Notable buildings

Couch's House in Lansallos Street was home to naturalist and physician, Jonathan Couch and before him of many generations of the Quiller family who became prosperous through the proceeds of smuggling and buccaneering.

Polperro's War Memorial is some distance outside the village on the coast path towards Talland. Also, tucked away in the village's winding streets (on "The Warren"), is a house clad entirely in shells, known colloquially as "The Shell House".

Churches
Situated in the Anglican diocese of Truro Polperro, although a small village, is served by two Church of England parishes divided by the River Pol: Lansallos to the west and Talland to the east. The 19th-century Anglican Chapel of St John, a chapel of ease to Talland Parish Church, stands in the village but no longer conducts services. John Wesley preached in the village in 1762 and 1768: by 1792 it was possible to build a large chapel accommodating 250 people and Methodism flourished in Polperro during the 1800s.

Sclerder Abbey, a Roman Catholic monastery, is located off the road to Looe, just outside the village.

Science
In the late 19th century, Sir Francis Galton conducted a study of fingerprints at Polperro. He chose the village because of the prevalence of intermarriage amongst its inhabitants, being only accessible from the sea or by coastal path at that time. His findings helped to advance criminology and sociology and include extensive genealogies of local families which are held at the College of Arms in London.

Notable residents
 Donald Adamson, author and historian
 Angela Brazil, novelist
 Anyon Cook, illustrator for Enid Blyton. (Harbour Studio)
 Jonathan Couch, naturalist, physician and antiquary
 Walter Greenwood, novelist, lived in Polperro briefly during the 1930s and founded the production company, Greenpark Productions, there in 1938.
 Zephaniah Job, "The Smugglers' Banker"
 Oskar Kokoschka, artist
 Richard and Judy (Richard Madeley and Judy Finigan), television presenters, live at Talland
 Rita Tushingham, actress lived in the village in the 1970s.
 Hugh Walpole, novelist

Council

Polperro Community Council is the lowest level of government for the parish.

References

Bibliography
Chambers, George Mervyn. Polperro: impressions in word and line, Polperro: Greywest, [ca. 1925]
Couch, Jonathan (1871) History of Polperro, ed. Thomas Quiller Couch (many later editions, abridged)
de Burlet, Sheila (1977) Portrait of Polperro: souvenir history of a beautiful village. Polperro Heritage Press [1997]
Derriman, James (1994) Killigarth: three centuries of a Cornish manor [16c-18c]: Polperro Heritage Press
Derriman, James (2006) Marooned: Polperro Heritage Press
Rowett Johns, Jeremy (1997) The Smugglers' Banker: Polperro Heritage Press 
Rowett Johns, Jeremy (2010) Doctor By Nature: Jonathan Couch, Surgeon of Polperro: Polperro Heritage Press

External links

Cornwall Record Office Online Catalogue for Polperro 
www.polperro.co.uk

 
Villages in Cornwall
Ports and harbours of Cornwall
Fishing communities in England
Seaside resorts in Cornwall
Civil parishes in Cornwall